This is a list of secondary schools in Bulawayo, a city and province in western Zimbabwe.

Private schools 
The following are church-operated or independent schools:

 Bulawayo Adventist High School
 Great Hills Heritage High School
 Christian Brothers College
 Dominican Convent High School
 Girls' College
 Green Gables High School
 Maranatha Adventist High School
 Masiyephambili College
 Petra High School
 Premier High School
 Prestige High School
 Sizane Secondary School
 Solusi Adventist High School
 St. Bernard's High School
 St. Columba's High School
Eastview High School
Liberty Christian College

Public schools 

 Amhlophe High School
 Cowdray Park Secondary School
 Emakhandeni High School
 Emganwini Secondary School
 Entumbane High School 
 Eveline High School
 Founders High School
 Gifford High School
 Hamilton High School
 Ihlati Secondary School
 Induna High School
 Inyanda High School
 Lobengula High School
 Luveve Secondary School
 Magwegwe High School
 Mandwandwe High School
 Masotsha High School
 Milton High School
 Mncumbatha Secondary School
 Montrose Girls' High School
 Mpopoma High School
 Msiteli High School
 Mzilikazi High School
 Njube High School
 Nketa High School
 Nkulumane Secondary School
 Northlea High School
 Pumula High School
 Pumula South Secondary School
 Sikhulile High School 
 Sobukazi High School
 Townsend High School

Former schools 

 Elite High School (operated 1999–2009)
 St. George's College (opened in Bulawayo in 1896; relocated to Salisbury in 1926)
St. Peter's Diocesan School (operated 1911–1977)

References 

Education in Bulawayo
Bulawayo, secondary schools

secondary schools in Bulawayo